Jukka Jokikokko (born 15 September 1970 in Pudasjärvi) is a Finnish bassist and studio engineer. He has played different kinds of music and is bassist on the band Zenith Reunion. He is a former member of Scarlet Thread, Burning Point, Stargazery and several other non-recorded bands.

Discography

As a bassist
Zenith Reunion - Entropy - (2015, 7Hard Records)
Stargazery - Stars aligned - (2015, Pure Legend Records/Rubicon)
Burning Point - The Ignitor (2012 on Scarlet Records)
Zenith Reunion - Utopia - (2012, Violent Journey Records)
Stargazery - Eye on the sky - (2011, Pure Legend Records/Rubicon)
Burning Point - Empyre - (2009, Soundholic/Metal Heaven)
Burning Point - Burned Down the Enemy - (2006/2007, Soundholic/Metal Heaven)
Scarlet Thread - Valheista Kaunein - (2006, Musea FGBG 4670 AR)
Scarlet Thread - Psykedeelisiä Joutsenlauluja - (2003, Mellow Records MMP448)
Scarlet Thread - Kalevala: A Finnish Progressive Rock Epic - (2003, Musea FGBG 4463.AR)
This compilation featured the song "Pimeästä Pohjolasta".
Scarlet Thread - Tuonen Tytär: A Tribute to Finnish Progressive - (2000, Mellow Records MMP385)
Scarlet Thread made a cover version of "Säikkyvä" by Sahti for this compilation.

As a studio engineer
National Napalm Syndicate - Time is the Fire - (2018, Iron Shield Records)
Zenith Reunion - Entropy - (2015, 7Hard Records)
Zenith Reunion - Utopia - (2012, Violent Journey Records)
Stargazery - Eye on the sky - (2011, Pure Legend Records/Rubicon)
Marella - Pieni maa -radio single (2010, Tuuba Records Oy)
Burning Point - Empyre - (2009, Soundholic/Metal Heaven)
Perfect Chaos - The Eightbound Five - (2007, CFTN Distribution CFTN 001)
Burning Point - Burned Down the Enemy - (2006/2007, Soundholic/Metal Heaven)
National Napalm Syndicate - Resurrection of the Wicked (2006, Poison Arrow Records)
Scarlet Thread - Valheista Kaunein (2006, Musea)
Scarlet Thread - Tuonen Tytär: A Tribute to Finnish Progressive - (2000, Mellow Records MMP385)

References

External links
Official website of Zenith Reunion
Official website of Scarlet Thread
Official website of Stargazery

1970 births
Finnish bass guitarists
Living people
People from Pudasjärvi
21st-century bass guitarists